Etlah is an unincorporated community in Franklin County, in the U.S. state of Missouri.

History
A post office called Etlah was established in 1864, and remained in operation until 1935. The name Etlah is the German verb halte (meaning "stop"), spelled backwards.

References

Unincorporated communities in Franklin County, Missouri
Unincorporated communities in Missouri